Julia Butler Hansen (June 14, 1907 – May 3, 1988) was an American politician who served as a member of the United States House of Representatives from 1960 to 1974. She represented Washington's Third Congressional District as a Democrat. She was the second woman and first Democratic woman elected to Congress from Washington.

Early life and education
Her father, Donald C. Butler, was sheriff of Wahkiakum County and her mother, Maude Eliza (Kimball), was named Washington's "Mother of the Year" in 1960. Hansen attended public school in Washington. She attended Oregon State College from 1924 to 1926, and graduated from the University of Washington (Seattle) with a Bachelor of Arts in home economics in 1930.

Entry to public service
Hansen's political career began as a member of the Cathlamet, Washington, city council, where she served from 1938 to 1946. She served in the Washington State Legislature as a member of the State House of Representatives from January 1939 until November 1960, serving as the first woman speaker pro tempore from 1955 to 1960. She served as chairman of the Western Interstate Committee on Highway Policies for 11 western states from 1951 to 1961.

United States Congress
She was elected simultaneously as a Democrat to the Eighty-sixth Congress and to the Eighty-seventh Congress by special election, to fill the vacancy caused by the death of United States Representative Russell V. Mack, and was re-elected to the six succeeding Congresses (November 8, 1960 – December 31, 1974). She served on the House Appropriations Committee after serving for years on Education, Labor, Veteran's Affairs, Interior and Insular Affairs Committees.

Later career

Hansen did not run for re-election to Congress in 1974, and was appointed in 1975 to a six-year term on the Washington State Toll Bridge Authority and State Highway Commission. She served as chair of the Washington State Transportation Commission from 1979 to 1981.

Anti-Semitism Allegation 
Edward I. Koch, later New York City mayor, recounted overhearing a conversation on the floor of the House in 1973 during a vote to fund arms replenishment to Israel during the Yom Kippur War. Speaking with two other members of Congress, Hansen allegedly "went off on a bizarre tangent, saying, 'You know, I was once cheated by a Jew,' and launching into a diatribe about how she did not like Jews."

Personal life
Hansen was the author of a book for children titled Singing Paddles, published by Binfords and Mort in 1935, which won the Julia Ellsworth Ford Foundation Award for Juvenile Literature. She married Henry A. Hansen, a logger, on July 15, 1939; they were parents of one natural son, David, and Henry's adopted son Richard. Hansen was also manager of the Wahkiakum County Abstract Company and the G. Henry Hanigan Insurance Co. in Cathlamet, and served as chairman and member of the board of trustees of Century 21, State of Washington, beginning in 1958.

Death and legacy
Hansen lived in Cathlamet until her death there on May 3, 1988. She is honored by the Julia Butler Hansen Refuge for the Columbian White-Tailed Deer, a National Wildlife Refuge established in 1972 in Cathlamet; the Julia Butler Hansen Elementary School, opened in 1994 in the Olympia School District in Olympia, Washington; and the Julia Butler Hansen Bridge connecting Cathlamet to Puget Island, Washington.

See also

 Women in the United States House of Representatives

References

Further reading

Archives
Julia Butler Hansen Papers. 1930–1984. 146 cubic feet. At the Labor Archives of Washington, University of Washington Libraries Special Collections.
Henry M. Jackson papers. 1912–1987. Approximately 1,240 cubic feet. At the Labor Archives of Washington, University of Washington Libraries Special Collections.

External links
Women in Congress profile
Julia Butler Hansen Committee Papers - Washington State University Libraries
Julia Butler Hansen National Wildlife Refuge
Julia Butler Hansen entry at The Political Graveyard

1907 births
1988 deaths
20th-century American politicians
20th-century American women politicians
Democratic Party members of the United States House of Representatives from Washington (state)
Female members of the United States House of Representatives
Democratic Party members of the Washington House of Representatives
Oregon State University alumni
Politicians from Portland, Oregon
University of Washington alumni
Women state legislators in Washington (state)
Washington (state) city council members
People from Cathlamet, Washington
Women city councillors in Washington (state)